2A45 and 2A45M are the respective GRAU  designations of the Sprut-A  and Sprut-B (Russian for octopus or kraken) Soviet smoothbore 125 mm anti-tank guns.

Development
The 2A45M was created in the late 1980s by the Petrov Design Bureau at Artillery Plant Number 9 (OKB-9), which was also responsible for the 122 mm howitzer 2A18 (D-30).

Description (Sprut-B)
A feature of the Sprut-B is its integrated engine, which can propel the gun on relatively flat surfaces (up to 15 degrees of slope) and at 14 km/h on roads. This gives the gun a measure of mobility on the battlefield. Changing gun position from travelling to firing takes 90 seconds; the reverse takes two minutes. Such guns are known in Russian as "self-moving" (самодвижущиеся) in contrast to self-propelled (самоходные), and outside of battle it is towed by an MT-LB.

The gun has a crew of seven. An OP4M-48A direct fire sight is used in daylight, and a 1PN53-1 night-vision sight is used at night. For indirect fire, 2Ts33 iron sights are used, with a PG-1m panoramic sight. The gun can reliably engage targets two metres high at a distance of 2,000 metres.

The barrel features a thermal sleeve to prevent temperature changes affecting the accuracy. The gun uses the same semi-fixed ammunition as the T-64, T-72, T-80, and T-90 tanks.

With the addition of the 9S53 laser fire-control system, the gun can fire laser guided projectiles such as the 9M119 Svir or 9K120 Refleks.

Ammunition

The gun uses the same ammunition as the D-81 series of guns used on the T-64, T-72, T-80 and T-90 tanks.

Models
 2A45 Sprut-A 
Stationary towed gun variant.
 2A45M Sprut-B 
Self-propelled towed gun variant that can move under its own power with the addition of wheels and a power unit.

Operators

Current operators
 
 
 : made under license, by KMDB, in the city of Kharkiv.

Former operators
  passed construction license to successor states

See also
 125 mm smoothbore ammunition
 2A46 125 mm gun - Soviet–Russian tank-mounted
 List of Soviet tanks

References
 Hull, A.W., Markov, D.R., Zaloga, S.J. (1999). Soviet/Russian Armor and Artillery Design Practices 1945 to Present. Darlington Productions. .
 Military Parade
 Enemy Forces
 2A45M on manufacturer site
 Jane's Armour and Artillery 2002-2003

External links
 Image

Anti-tank guns of the Soviet Union
Anti-tank guns of Russia
Cold War artillery of the Soviet Union
125 mm artillery
Anti-tank guns of the Cold War
Military equipment introduced in the 1980s